George Kenneth Robert McKinley (born 3 November 1993) is a cricketer from Larne, Northern Ireland, who has played at Larne Grammar School, Larne town and Ballymena, then at first-class level for Loughborough MCC University. He debuted for them during the 2015 English season, having earlier played for the Ireland national under-19 side.

He made his List A debut for Northern Knights in the 2017 Inter-Provincial Cup on 29 May 2017. He made his Twenty20 debut for Northern Knights in the 2017 Inter-Provincial Trophy on 16 June 2017.

References

External links

1993 births
Living people
Cricketers from Northern Ireland
Irish cricketers
Loughborough MCCU cricketers
People from Larne
Northern Knights cricketers
Sportspeople from County Antrim